Alyson Charles (born October 30, 1998) is a Canadian short track speed skater. She participated at the 2019 World Short Track Speed Skating Championships, winning a bronze medal in the 3,000 m relay.

Career
Charles competed at the 2016 and 2017 ISU World Junior Championships. Charles won the gold medal in the 3000m relay at the 2018 ISU World Junior Championships.

Charles won her first-ever World Cup medal in 500m at Calgary in 2018.  She participated at the 2019 World Short Track Speed Skating Championships, winning a bronze medal in the 3000m relay.

Personal life
Charles began skating at the age of six in Montreal, Quebec.

References

External links

1998 births
Living people
Canadian female short track speed skaters
Four Continents Short Track Speed Skating Championships medalists
Olympic short track speed skaters of Canada
Short track speed skaters at the 2022 Winter Olympics
Speed skaters from Montreal
World Short Track Speed Skating Championships medalists
21st-century Canadian women